Chibuike Rotimi Amaechi (born 27 May 1965) is a Nigerian politician, he served as the Federal Minister of Transportation of Nigeria from 2015 to 2022 under the cabinet of President Muhammadu Buhari. He resigned to contest for Nigeria's presidency under the ruling All Progressive Congress (APC). He previously served as governor of oil-rich Rivers State from 2007 to 2015 and Speaker of the Rivers State House of Assembly from 1999 to 2007. On 9 April 2022, Amaechi declared his interest to contest in the Presidential election in 2023, he came second in the APC presidential primaries held in June 2022 behind Bola Tinubu with 316 votes from the delegates.

Background
Amaechi was born in Ubima, Ikwerre Local Government Area of Rivers State to the family of the late Elder Fidelis Amaechi and Mary Amaechi. His first and last names are Igbo  meaning “God is strength or power” and “who knows tomorrow” respectively. He was raised in Diobu, a densely populated neighbourhood in Port Harcourt.

He had his early education at St Theresa's Primary School from 1970 to 1976. He earned his West African Senior School Certificate in 1982 after attending Government Secondary School Okolobiri. Amaechi received a Bachelor of Arts degree (Honours) in English Studies and Literature from the University of Port Harcourt in 1987, where he was the President of the National Union of Rivers State Students (NURSS).

He completed the mandatory National Youth Service Corps in 1988, and thereafter joined Pamo Clinics and Hospitals Limited owned by Peter Odili, where he worked until 1992. He also a director of several companies, including West Africa Glass Industry Limited and Risonpalm Nigeria Limited.

On November 19th 2022, Amaechi announced on his Twitter handle that he is a certified graduate of Law alongside pictures of his convocation.

Early political career
During the transition to the Third Nigerian Republic, Amaechi was Secretary of the National Republican Convention in Ikwerre Local Government Area of Rivers State. Between 1992 and 1994, he was Special Assistant to the Deputy Governor of Rivers State, Peter Odili  –  his boss believed in Amaechi as a young man with potential in politics, and brought him under his wing. In 1996, he was the Rivers State's Secretary of the Democratic Party of Nigeria (DPN) caretaker committee during the transition programme of General Sani Abacha.

Rivers State House of Assembly (1999–2007) 

In 1999, he contested and won a seat to become a member of the Rivers State House of Assembly to represent his constituency. He was subsequently elected as the Speaker of the House of Assembly. Amaechi was elected the Chairman of Nigeria's Conference of Speakers of State Assemblies. In May 2003, he was re-elected as the Speaker. In 2003, when the National Assembly moved to hijack the legislative functions of the State House of Assembly as enshrined in the constitution, he and his colleagues took the matter to Supreme Court.

As speaker, Amaechi used his close working relationship with Governor Peter Odili to increase the harmonious relationship between the Executive and Legislative arms of government in Rivers State, until when Rotimi Amaechi launched a campaign against the State Government, and verbally attacked the image of the State Governor, in an effort to succeed Peter Odili as governor in 2007.

Governor of Rivers State
In 2007, Amaechi contested and won the People's Democratic Party (PDP) primary for Rivers State Governor in 2007. His name was substituted by the party, an action which he challenged in court. The case eventually got to the Supreme Court. He became governor on 26 October 2007, after the Supreme Court ruled that he was the rightful candidate of the PDP and winner of the April 2007 Governorship election in Rivers State.

His administration invested in infrastructure development, construction of roads and bridges, sticking to the vision of connecting all parts of the state by road. The governor was also committed to urban renewal and modernization of transportation services. His administration began building a monorail to provide mass transportation within the city of Port Harcourt. Some power plant projects (Afam, Trans Amadi, Onne) were also built to improve power supply in the State.

He was re-elected for a second term on 26 April 2011. In August 2013, Amaechi was amongst seven serving governors who formed the G-7 faction within the PDP. In November 2013, Amaechi alongside five members of the G-7 defected to the new opposition party the All Progressives Congress (APC) and became director general of Muhammadu Buhari's presidential campaign.

Minister of Transportation 
In 2015, following Muhammadu Buhari's election, Amaechi was appointed to his cabinet as Federal Minister of Transportation. In July 2019, he was re-nominated for ministerial appointment by President Buhari. Amaechi was asked to take a bow and go during his screening by the Senate.

Personal life
He is married to Judith Amaechi and they have three boys. He is a Catholic and a Knight of the order of Saint John (KSJ).

On 27 May 2021, The Nigerian honorable Minister of transportation, Rt. Hon. Rotimi Amaechi, turned singer and released his debut single titled 'Blessed The People The Lord Has Chosen As His Heritage' in collaboration with his wife, Judith in commemoration of his 56th birthday.

Awards 
Amaechi holds the national honour of the Commander of the Order of the Niger (CON).

See also
List of people from Rivers State
List of Governors of Rivers State by time in office
List of Governors of Rivers State
Cabinet of Nigeria

References

External links
Profile of Rt. Hon. Chibuike Rotimi Amaechi, Governor of Rivers State.
Who's Who: Governor Chibuike Rotimi Amaechi, Africa Confidential

Living people
1965 births
Governors of Rivers State
People from Ikwerre (local government area)
Rivers State Peoples Democratic Party politicians
University of Port Harcourt alumni
People from Diobu, Port Harcourt
All Progressives Congress politicians
Peoples Democratic Party state governors of Nigeria
Speakers of the Rivers State House of Assembly
Ikwerre people
Nigerian Roman Catholics
Government ministers of Nigeria
Commanders of the Order of the Niger
Transport ministers of Nigeria